Arthur Walter Evans  (alias "Walter Simpson") (8 April 1891 – 1 November 1936) was an English recipient of the Victoria Cross, the highest award for gallantry in the face of the enemy that can be awarded to British and Commonwealth forces.

Details
Evans was 27 years old, and a lance sergeant in the 6th Battalion, The Lincolnshire Regiment, British Army, during the First World War when the following deed took place for which he was awarded the VC. He was awarded the VC under the alias Walter Simpson with which he had enlisted in the army.

On 2 September 1918 south west of Etaing, France, a patrol reconnoitring on the west bank of a river sighted an enemy machine-gun on the east bank. The river being very deep at that point, Lance Sergeant Evans volunteered to swim across and having done so crawled up behind the machine-gun post, where he shot the sentry and another man and made four more surrender. After a crossing had been found and one officer and one man joined him, machine-gun and rifle fire was opened on them. The officer was wounded and Sergeant Evans covered his withdrawal under very heavy fire.

The citation
The citation reads:

He was later permitted to re-assume his original name.

Further information
After the war he emigrated to Australia and served in the Australian Tank Corps.

References

External links 
Location of grave and VC medal (Lancashire)
Evans confused with a Burnley Hero
 
 Liverpool VCs (James Murphy, Pen and Sword Books, 2008)

1891 births
1936 deaths
Royal Lincolnshire Regiment soldiers
British World War I recipients of the Victoria Cross
British Army personnel of World War I
Recipients of the Distinguished Conduct Medal
British emigrants to Australia
Victoria Cross awardees from Liverpool
Australian Army soldiers
British Army recipients of the Victoria Cross